Bipasha is a 1962 Indian Bengali-language drama film starring Uttam Kumar and Suchitra Sen. and directed by Agradoot. The film is based on a novel titled Bipasha by Sri Tarashankar Bandyopadhay.The story fleetingly describes the horror of riots in West Pakistan during the time of Partition of India. Bipasa was described as a victim of that riot in the film. However, the film deviates from the original novel and avoids describing Bipasha as a gang rape victim by Pakistani Islamist rioters.

It is one of the many hit films in which Uttam Kumar and Suchitra Sen worked as a pair. The other cast members included Chhabi Biswas, Chhaya Debi, Pahari Sanyal, Jiben Bose and Tulsi Chakrabarti.

Plot
The storyline goes when Dibyendu Chattopadhyay (Uttam Kumar) the young engineer meets Bipasha Bhattacharya (Suchitra Sen) in today's Maithon. Their acquaintance soon reaches a stage when the young couple decide to get married. However, on the night of her marriage to Dibyendu the latter fails to turn up due to a message sent to him by his uncle. Bipasha finds out Dibyendu's uncle and tracks him to Allahabad. Bipasha later finds that there were allegations against the moral character of Dibyendu's mother (Chhaya Devi).

The film revolves around the story of redemption of honour of Dibyendu's mother's in the eyes of society. It became known by the end of the film that Dibyendu's father had been in an affair with and thereafter married an English girl. To save himself from being imprisoned, he alleged that his wife (Dibyendu's mother) was unfaithful, and refused to acknowledge his own son (Dibyendu) as legitimate.

Cast
Uttam Kumar as Dibyendu Chattopadhyay
Suchitra Sen as Bipasha Bhattacharya
Chhabi Biswas as Swamiji alias Dibyendu's father
Chhaya Debi as Dibyendu's mother
Nitish Mukherjee as Maternal Uncle to Dibyendu
Pahari Sanyal as Barrister, a friend of Dibyendu's father
Tulsi Chakrabarti as Paan Shop Owner
Jiben Bose as Dibyendu's co-worker and a friend
Lily Chakravarty as Jashoda, Bipasha's classmate and friend
Kamal Mitra as Hardayal Singh

Production
For this role Sen got the payment of rupees one lakh and became the highest paid actor/actress in Bengali cinema at that time, while Uttam Kumar got the payment of rupees eighty thousands. After this film Sen permanently fixed her salary of one lakh.

Reception
This film become blockbuster hit and ran for 77 days in theaters and this is one of the biggest hit of Uttam Suchitra. In an article honoring the actors 35 years after Uttam Kumar's death, The Indian Express wrote "Suchitra Sen, Uttam Kumar heralded the golden era of Bengali cinema", and listed Bipasha as among their most popular films.  The Telegraph listed it among the duo's "string of memorable hits", and when speaking the two as box office draws, The Pioneer listed at as among their biggest hits.

Soundtrack

References

External links
 

1962 films
Bengali-language Indian films
Films scored by Robin Chatterjee
1960s Bengali-language films
Films directed by Agradoot
Films based on works by Tarasankar Bandyopadhyay